Iginari Tohoku San (いぎなり東北産, stylized in English as MADE IN TOHOKU) is a Japanese girl idol group, formed by Stardust Promotion in August 2015.

The group is based in Tohoku Region and is managed by Stardust Promotion's regional Sendai office.

Members

Former Members

Timeline 

 On 12/04/2017 there was a change of color for Miu and Karen

History 

2015

On August 9, the group appeared in the Stardust Section 3 Sales Office Festival at the Grand Front Osaka Knowledge Theater as a five-person group called Nidaime Iginari. The original members were Hikaru Ritsuki, Risa Minato, Rine Kitami, Yuna Hazuki, and Waka Yasumori. The average age of the group was 12.8.

On September 12, Hinano Sakura and Kaaya Date joined the group.

On October 24, Karen Tachibana was incorporated into the group in the Stardust Section 3 event Eigyousho Matsuri.

2016

On July 3, Miu Fujitani joined the group, bringing the total number of group members to nine. Karen Tachibana was named as the leader of the group and Yuna Hazuki as sub-leader. The average age of the group was then 12.6.

On August 7, the group appeared at the Tokyo Idol Festival 2016.

On November 27, the group's single "Tenka Ippin" was shown at Darwin Event. They change their group name to Iginari Tohoku San.

2017

On January 8, Karen, Hikaru, Risa, Rine, and Waka participated in Stardust Section 3 event Ore No Next Girl 2017 Mochiron Fujii. They won first place and the opportunity of acting in Stella Ball.

On February 19, Tohoku announced the release of its first album.

On March 26, First Two Man Live with Sakura Ebis, Tenka Ippin was released, as was Mugen Kageki (a collaboration single with Sakura Ebis).

On April 2, Risa Minato took an indefinite hiatus.

On April 21, the group's official blog was started.

On May 5, the group performed Second Two Man Live with Sakura Ebis in Miyagi La La La Hall.

On June 24, they announced their first tour for August 2017, with planned stops in Aomori, Yamagata, Fukushima, and Omiya.

On June 24, the group announced that the release date of their second single "High Tension Summer" would be on July 30, 2017.

On July 30, "High Tension Summer" was released. The group presented their official overture.

On August 4 and 5, the group appeared in the Tokyo Idol Festival 2017, performing a total of four times.

On August 6, the group participated in the SIF (Idol festival hosted by Momoclo). They received third place in the competition of the best performance of the festival with 986 points.

On August 12–16, they released their Car Tour.

On September 20, Minato Risa confirms her graduation for October 14 Event.

On November 19, "Travel" was released.

On December 23, their first Christmas Event at @Sendai Wakabayashi Ward Cultural Center Hall was held. They mobilized 534 people and overcame the target of 500. They presented the new single Kansai Nippon.

On December 31, they appeared at the Western Japan Idol Festival hosted by Tacoyaki Rainbow (Grand Cube Osaka).

2018

On February 12, they appeared at the 3 man festival with Sakura Ebis, Petit Passpo and Up up girls on Yokohama bay hall

On March 4, they appeared at Hawaiians Monthly Super Live (@ Spa Resort Hawaiians).

On March 21, "Itadaki Launcher" was released.

on May 27, In the "Eagles Event (First ball start ceremony)". The release of the 5th single was announced for July 14. 
They talked about the possibility of new members joining the group.

on June 7, Karen fulfills her dream and sings for the first time with Sasaki Ayaka (Momoiro Clover Z) in the Sakazaki Kounosuke no Momoiro Folk Mura show. Aarin was the reason why she becomes an idol.

On November 3, The group announced by twitcast that in the concert of December 30 in Toyosu PIT a new member will be incorporated.

On November 23, Shinju Kichise joined the group.

On December 30, The official page madeintohoku.com was opened. The number of attendants on their Christmas Event grew to 1021 people.

2019

On March 3–31, The group did their first Live House Tour (Morioka, Sendai, Koriyama, Yamagata, Akita, Aomori)

On August 9, In the 4th Anniversary of the group, they launched their first MV "BUUBLE POPPIN"

2020

On March 20, The group released their first Album "Tohoku Inbound"

On August 10, Kahya chan becomes the main character of the new dorama/anime live-action Aikatsu Planet

Discography 

Albums

Collaboration Singles

References 

Japanese idol groups
Japanese girl groups
Japanese pop music groups
Child musical groups
Japanese-language singers
Musical groups established in 2015
2015 establishments in Japan
Stardust Promotion artists